R355 road may refer to:
 R355 road (Ireland)
 R355 road (South Africa)